G-protein-coupled receptor kinase 7 (GRK7, cone opsin kinase, iodopsin kinase) is a serine/threonine-specific protein kinase involved in phototransduction. This enzyme catalyses the phosphorylation of cone (color) photopsins in retinal cones during high acuity color vision primarily in the fovea.

More on GRK7 
GRK7 is a member of the family of G protein-coupled receptor kinases, and is officially named G protein-coupled receptor kinase 7. GRK7 is found primarily in mammalian retinal cone cells, where it phosphorylates light-activated photopsins, members of the family of G protein-coupled receptors that recognize light of various wavelengths (red, green, blue). Phosphorylated, light-activated photopsin binds to the cone arrestin protein arrestin-4 to terminate the light-activated signaling cascade. The related GRK1, also known as rhodopsin kinase, serves a similar function in retinal rod cells subserving dim light black-and-white peripheral vision outside the fovea. The post-translational modification of GRK7 by geranylgeranylation and α-carboxyl methylation is important for regulating the ability of the enzyme to recognize color opsins in cone outer segment disk membranes.

Arrestin-1 bound to rhodopsin in retinal rods prevents rhodopsin activation of the transducin protein to turn off photo-transduction completely. While cone visual transduction is much less well characterized, it is expected that arrestin-4 bound to GRK7-phosphorylated color photopsin prevents opsin activation of the transducin protein to turn off photo-transduction completely.

References